CISP may refer to:

Cardholder Information Security Program
Celtic Inscribed Stones Project